Annouville-Vilmesnil is a commune in the Seine-Maritime department in the Normandy region in northern France.

Geography

Heraldry

Population

Places of interest
 The church of St. Germain, dating from the thirteenth century.
 Ruins of a medieval chateau.

See also
Communes of the Seine-Maritime department

References

Communes of Seine-Maritime